The Derwent Valley Light Railway (DVLR) (also known as The Blackberry Line) was a privately owned standard-gauge railway in North Yorkshire, England, and was unusual in that it was never nationalised, remaining as a private operation all its life. It ran between Layerthorpe on the outskirts of York to Cliffe Common near Selby. It opened in two stages, in 1912 and 1913, and closed in sections between 1965 and 1981. Between 1977 and 1979, passenger steam trains operated between Layerthorpe and Dunnington — the entire length of track at that time. In 1993 a small section was re-opened as part of the Yorkshire Museum of Farming at Murton.

The line gained its nickname of The Blackberry Line in the days when it used to transport blackberries to markets in Yorkshire and London.

History
The south end of the railway, from Wheldrake to Cliffe Common, was opened on 29 October 1912, with the remainder of the line opening on 19 July 1913. Although it was constructed primarily as a freight line, passenger trains were introduced from 1913, and during the First World War it was used as a diversionary route by the North Eastern Railway between York and Selby. Passenger services ended in 1926, though freight traffic prospered through the Second World War.

In 1923, most British railway companies were grouped into four large companies, with the nearby North Eastern Railway becoming part of the London and North Eastern Railway. However, the DVLR remained independent, and continued to do so even after nationalisation in 1948.

By 1961 normal traffic consisted of one return journey per day. A sympathetic group of guests described the line as "a cross between Emmett and "The Titfield Thunderbolt." Their photographs and text portrayed a museum piece operating in harmony with staff, timeless practice and local wildlife.

In 1964, British Railways closed the Selby to Driffield Line, meaning that the junction at Cliffe Common became redundant. With the connection to Selby now gone, the DVLR was left isolated at its southern end. The line was subsequently run from the Layerthorpe end but traffic generated by the southern section of the track was light so the decision was taken to close the line between Wheldrake and Cliffe Common in 1965. The section between Wheldrake and Elvington followed in 1968. Two special trains were run along the whole length of the line in January 1965, being the last passenger trains to do so.

Final years
In 1976, the owners of the railway decided to operate steam trains between Layerthorpe and Dunnington, which was the entire length of the line at that time. A regular summer service started in 1977, with J72  locomotive number 69023 Joem (now preserved at the North Yorkshire Moors Railway) operating the services. By 1979, there were not enough passengers to justify continuing and the service ceased. The railway continued to carry occasional freight trains to Dunnington until 1981 when the grain driers at Dunnington closed and the last major source of freight for the line was gone. On top of that the railway was in desperate need of a major overhaul with the majority of the rails and buildings still being the 1913 originals. However, the owners decided that the lack of demand for freight failed to justify any plan of action other than to close the line down. The last train ran on 27 September 1981. In 1984 the holding company, Derwent Valley Holdings, became Derwent London, now a multimillion-pound property investment and development company.

The Foss Islands Branch Line, to which the Derwent Valley Light Railway connected at Layerthorpe, was subsequently closed in 1989, and lifted in 1992.

Preservation

Until 1990, a small preservation group, the Great Yorkshire Railway Preservation Society, was originally based at Starbeck near Harrogate. A new station was constructed using the original station buildings from Wheldrake, and the railway re-opened in 1993.

The line now runs a mixture of nine diesel locomotives on Sundays and bank holidays.

The track-bed from Layerthorpe to Osbaldwick, along with part of the former Foss Islands Branch Line in York, has been converted to a foot and cycle path, part of Sustrans route 66.

Whilst future extension of the line towards Osbaldwick may be possible, as of 2018 there are currently still no formal plans for this.

Route

 Layerthorpe
 Osbaldwick
 Murton Lane
 Dunnington Halt
 Dunnington (for Kexby)
 Elvington
 Wheldrake
 Cottingwith
 Thorganby
 Skipwith
 Cliffe Common, which connected with the Selby to Driffield Line

Rolling stock 1913–1981

Initially trains were worked by locomotives owned by the North Eastern Railway (from 1923 LNER and from 1948 British Railways).

The railway purchased two railcars in the 1920s to operate a passenger service and the table below lists the stock owned by the company in the 1920s

Between 1929 and 1969 the line was again worked by main line locomotives.

In 1969 the DVLR decided to buy two ex-British Rail Class 04 shunters to operate services rather than hiring in British Rail Class 03 locomotives. The table below lists the locomotives owned by the DVLR

Joem was purchased to run the short lived steam train passenger operation.

Rolling stock 1993-present
The following rolling stock is owned by the preservation group as of January 2021:

Diesel Locomotives

Carriages
 North Eastern Railway 4-wheel coach No. 1214/2462 built in 1890. (Under repair)
 B&W Engineering 4-wheel observation coach No. BW1000 "Sylvia" built in 2003. (Operational)
 Southern Railway 4-wheel PMV Luggage Van No. S1367S built in 1939. (under restoration)
 British Railways Mk1 TSO No. E4990. (Under overhaul, on loan from NYMR)

Wagons
 British Railways Standard 20-ton Brake Van No. B951144 built in 1951. (Operational)
 Metro-Cammell ZFV Dogfish Ballast Wagon No. DB993312 built in 1957. (Operational)
 British Railways 12 ton Box Van No. 775810 built in 1957. (Operational)
 British Railways 12 ton Box Van No. 762112 built in 1954. (Operational)
 Chas Roberts Shell Mex and BP Tank Wagon No. 5081 built in 1938. (Operational)
 NCB Coal Wagon K264. No. B291264. (Operational)
 Great Western Railway Box Van No. W95166 built in 1915. (Operational)
 London and North Eastern Railway 20 ton Plate Wagon No. 239666 built in 1940. (Operational)
 LMS hopper wagon chassis. Date and number unknown (Operational)

In art and culture

In 1952, the artist L. S. Lowry painted three scenes of York as a commission from York Art Gallery. One of the pictures, entitled A View of York (from Tang Hall Bridge) depicts playing fields next to the railway, with a cooling tower (since demolished) and York Minster in the background. The painting was sold to a private collector, but was loaned to the art gallery in 2015 for temporary display.

In 2013, York soprano Rebecca Newman, with the enthusiastic participation of DVLR staff and a cast of children and adults from the theatre company We Are Theatre, with the fixed equipment and rolling stock of the railway, and Maggi the puppy, created her version of the song Wonderful Dream (Holidays are Coming) as a charity Christmas video, on YouTube. It was very well reviewed and by November 2015 received over 200,000 views on YouTube.

References

External links

DVLR website
The Derwent Valley Railway (Transfer) Light Railway Order 1987

Heritage railways in Yorkshire
Minor British railway companies
Light railways
Tourist attractions in North Yorkshire